Salvia heldreichiana is species of flowering plant in the family Lamiaceae. It is a bushy perennial, endemic to Turkey and rarely seen in cultivation.

References

heldreichiana
Flora of Turkey
Taxa named by Pierre Edmond Boissier
Taxa named by Alphonse Pyramus de Candolle